Wootton Manor is a country house in Folkington, East Sussex. Originally a mediaeval manor house, from which parts of the chapel survive, it was rebuilt in the mid-17th century in a rather old-fashioned Jacobean style.  Rupert Gwynne and his wife settled in the house after their marriage in 1905, and later commissioned the Arts and Crafts architect Detmar Blow to restore and extend the house, which he did in four directions, and add outbuildings, as well as working in the gardens. The cookery writer Elizabeth David, and her three sisters, grew up in this house.

The central building has been listed as Grade II* by English Heritage.

References

Sources

Grade II* listed houses
Grade II* listed buildings in East Sussex
Country houses in East Sussex
Jacobean architecture in the United Kingdom